Chillout 2002/The Ultimate Chillout is a compilation album released by Nettwerk. It was released on May 7, 2002.

Critical reception 

Billboard considered it a good compilation for those "in need of some post-club musical excursions".

Track listing 
Adapted from AllMusic and the album's official liner notes.

Charts

References

External links 
 

2002 compilation albums
Nettwerk Records compilation albums